Gymnopis syntrema is a species of caecilian in the family Dermophiidae. It is found in Belize, Guatemala, and possibly Honduras. Its natural habitats are subtropical or tropical moist lowland forests, subtropical or tropical moist montane forests, plantations, rural gardens, and heavily degraded former forest. It is threatened by habitat loss.

References

External links
 Amphibian Web

syntrema
Amphibians of Guatemala
Amphibians of Belize
Amphibians described in 1866
Taxonomy articles created by Polbot